South Righa is a geographical, historical and ethnological region of Algeria, in Setif Province, which consists mainly of Berbers and is subdivided into parts (Beni Righa, Beni Ouerra, etc.).

Demography 
The region is divided into several parts: 
Tribe of Berber origin (Kabyle and Chaoui descent):
Ouled Brahim
Zeghaba
Mouassa
Frikates
Ouled Bibi
Ouled Lmadaci
Ouled Ben Amer Sebaâ
Ouled Mtaa

Tribe of Arab origin (Ayad and Douaouda descent) :
Ouled Tebbane
Ahl Annouel
Ahl Bouthaleb
Ouled Kemadja
Ahl al-Hamma
Ouled Hanneche

References

Berber populated places
Populated places in Sétif Province